Sporti Shqiptar was a newspaper published in Albania.

History
Sporti Shqiptar was established on 28 November 1935 by Luigj Shala and Anton Mazreku and was considered at the time the first sports publication in the region. The paper survived following the collapse of the communist regime in Albania.

Its headquarters were in Tirana, Albania. The newspaper mainly published articles about events in the Albanian Superliga and the Albanian Cup and other European leagues.

See also
 List of newspapers in Albania

References

Defunct newspapers published in Albania
Sports newspapers published in Albania
Sports mass media in Albania
Albanian-language newspapers
Sports newspapers
Mass media in Tirana